Allan Marsh (born 8 November 1962) is a Jamaican former swimmer who competed in the 1984 Summer Olympics.

References

1962 births
Living people
Jamaican male swimmers
Male backstroke swimmers
Male butterfly swimmers
Olympic swimmers of Jamaica
Pan American Games competitors for Jamaica
Commonwealth Games competitors for Jamaica
Swimmers at the 1982 Commonwealth Games
Swimmers at the 1983 Pan American Games
Swimmers at the 1984 Summer Olympics
Central American and Caribbean Games gold medalists for Jamaica
Competitors at the 1982 Central American and Caribbean Games
Central American and Caribbean Games medalists in swimming
20th-century Jamaican people
21st-century Jamaican people